The Book of the Tower is the title of two Nestorian Christian works:

Kitāb al-Majdal of Mari ibn Suleiman (12th century)
Kitāb al-Majdal of Amr ibn Matta (14th century)

12th-century Arabic books
12th-century Christian texts
History of Eastern Christianity
Nestorian texts